Macrina the Elder (before AD 270 – ) was the mother of Basil the Elder, and the grandmother of Basil the Great, Gregory of Nyssa, Peter of Sebaste, and Macrina the Younger.

Life
The works of Basil indicate that she studied under Gregory Thaumaturgus, and that it was his teachings handed down through Macrina to Basil and Gregory, that were particularly formative for the two Cappadocian brothers. 

Her home was at Neocaesarea in Pontus and according to Gregory Nazianzen, during the persecution of Christians under Galerius and Diocletian, Macrina fled with her husband to the shores of the Black Sea. Once the persecution had passed, Macrina and her family returned to Neocaesarea.

She was widowed and is the patron of widows. Macrina is also the patron against poverty. Her feast is celebrated on 14 January. She is said to have died in the early 340s AD.

References 

3rd-century births
340s deaths
4th-century Christian saints
Late Ancient Christian female saints
3rd-century Romans
4th-century Romans
Saints from Roman Anatolia
People from Niksar